This is a list of members of the 21st Legislative Assembly of Queensland from 1918 to 1920, as elected at the 1918 state election held on 16 March 1918.

During the term, several National Party members switched allegiance to the new Country Party.

Notes 
 On 14 October 1919, the Premier of Queensland and Labor member for Barcoo, T. J. Ryan, resigned to run for West Sydney at the 1919 federal election. Labor candidate Frank Bulcock won the resulting by-election on 20 December 1919.
 On 14 October 1919, the Labor member for Leichhardt, Herbert Hardacre, resigned. Labor candidate Tom Foley won the resulting by-election on 20 December 1919.
 On 22 October 1919, the Labor member for Maranoa, John McEwan Hunter, resigned to take up the role of the Queensland Agent-General in England. Country candidate Thomas Spencer won the resulting by-election on 20 December 1919.
 On 16 January 1920, the Labor member for Herbert, William Lennon, resigned. Labor candidate Percy Pease won the resulting by-election on 10 April 1920.

References

 Waterson, Duncan Bruce: Biographical Register of the Queensland Parliament 1860–1929 (second edition), Sydney 2001.

See also
1918 Queensland state election
Ryan Ministry (Labor) (1915–1919)
Theodore Ministry (Labor) (1919–1925)

Members of Queensland parliaments by term
20th-century Australian politicians